The men's 3000 metres steeplechase at the 2013 Asian Athletics Championships was held at the Shree Shiv Chhatrapati Sports Complex on 5 July.

Results

References
Results

3000
Steeplechase at the Asian Athletics Championships